Éloi Pélissier (born 18 June 1991) is a French professional rugby league footballer who plays as a  for Toulouse Olympique in the Betfred Championship and France at international level.

He has previously played for the Catalans Dragons and the Leigh Centurions in the Super League, the London Broncos in the Championship and the Betfred Super League and the Lézignan Sangliers in the Elite One Championship.

Background
Pelissier was born in Perpignan, Languedoc-Roussillon, France. He is of Spanish descent.

Playing career
Pélissier had a trial with Wigan Warriors in 2008 in their Under 18s squad. He made 2 appearances against Huddersfield Giants and Hull Kingston Rovers playing centre but failed to earn a contract.

In 2009 and 2010 Pélissier played for St Estève in the Elite One Championship. He has repressed France at Under 20s level and was included in the French train-on squad for 2010 Alitalia European Cup.

He joined the Catalans Dragons in 2011. Pelissier made his Super League début for the Dragons in a 22-16 defeat by St Helens in 2011, coming off the bench to play at hooker. He then played the week after, in a 31-18 victory over Hull Kingston Rovers.

Pélissier went on to establish himself as a regular in the Dragons side, and made his full international debut for France in 2011. He played for France in the 2013 Rugby League World Cup and 2014 European Cup. Pélissier returned to the international stage in the end of year test match against England in Avignon. He scored France's lone try in the match as the French went on to be smashed 6-40.

He signed with Lézignan Sangliers for the 2017-18 season.

Toulouse Olympique
On 2 November 2020, it was reported that he had signed for Toulouse Olympique in the RFL Championship.  In round 23 of the 2022 Super League season, Pélissier scored two tries for Toulouse Olympique in a 32-18 loss against Warrington.

References

External links

London Broncos profile
Leigh Centurions profile
France profile
2017 RLWC profile
SL profile
French profile
France RL profile

1991 births
Living people
AS Saint Estève players
Catalans Dragons players
France national rugby league team players
French people of Spanish descent
French rugby league players
Leigh Leopards players
Lézignan Sangliers players
London Broncos players
Rugby league hookers
Sportspeople from Perpignan
Toulouse Olympique players